Arnold Lee Kanter (February 27, 1945 – April 10, 2010) was an American businessman who served as acting United States Secretary of State following the resignation of the previous United States Secretary of State Lawrence Eagleburger at midnight on January 20, 1993, until his own resignation at noon that same day. He had previously served as Under Secretary of State for Political Affairs from 1991 to 1993. Kanter also held a position on the White House staff from 1989 to 1991 as Special Assistant to the President and served in a variety of capacities in the State Department from 1977 to 1985.  Kanter served on the faculty of both Ohio State University, and the University of Michigan, and also worked for several years in the 1980s at the RAND Corporation.

Kanter was born in Chicago and was a founding member of The Scowcroft Group.  Kanter died of cancer in April 2010.

He was married to Anne Strassman and had two children; Clare and Noah Kanter.

References

External links

1945 births
2010 deaths
University of Michigan alumni
Ohio State University faculty
Under Secretaries of State for Political Affairs
Acting United States Secretaries of State
Politicians from Chicago
Deaths from cancer in Maryland